Sun Li-jen (December 8, 1900November 19, 1990) was a Chinese Nationalist (KMT) general, a graduate of Virginia Military Institute, best known for his leadership in the Second Sino-Japanese War and the Chinese Civil War.  His military achievements earned him the laudatory nickname "Rommel of the East". His New First Army was known as the "Best Army under heaven" and credited with effectively confronting Japanese troops in the 1937 Battle of Shanghai and in the Burma Campaign, 1943–1944.

Perhaps because of his foreign military training, he did not have the full confidence of Chiang Kai-shek. Sun was relieved of battle command in the Chinese Civil War in 1946, and although he was made Commander in Chief in 1950 after the retreat of the Nationalist central government to Taiwan, he was given only ceremonial roles. He was charged with conspiracy in 1955 and spent his last thirty years under virtual house arrest.

He was also known as Sun Chung-neng (孫仲能, Sūn Zhòngnéng; "Chung-neng" being his art name) and had the courtesy name Fu-min (撫民, Fǔmín).

Biography

Early life
Sun Li-jen was born in Jinnu, Lujiang, Chaohu, Anhui, with ancestry in Shucheng County. During the May Fourth Movement, he was part of the Scouts in the march at Tiananmen Square. In the same year (1919) he married Gong Xitao (龔夕濤) and was admitted in 1920 to Tsinghua University to study civil engineering.  Sun played basketball at Tsinghua, becoming a star.  He led the Chinese team to a gold medal at the 1921 Far Eastern Championship Games.
 
With a Boxer Indemnity Scholarship, he transferred to Purdue University in the United States to complete his senior year in 1923, where he graduated in 1924. He briefly interned at Chicago Bridge & Iron Company in Chicago, Illinois. But patriotism motivated him to change career and pursue a military studies instead. China was in the middle of a nationalist drive to unite the divided country and to protect the nation against imperialists. Sun decided that he could better serve his divided nation as a soldier rather than an engineer.

He applied to the Virginia Military Institute. He graduated from VMI. In 1927 Sun toured Europe and Japan to see the latest military organization and strategic thinking, then returned to China and became a corporal in the National Revolutionary Army and the Central Political Institute. He was then given command of the National Salt Gabelle Brigade, organized by Finance Minister T. V. Soong, which he made the KMT's best trained and equipped troops. Four of the regiments later became the New 38th Division. His training center was located in Duyun, in Guizhou province.

Second Sino-Japanese War

Sun led his troops fighting the Japanese during the Battle of Shanghai in 1937 and was badly wounded by mine fragments. After recovering, Sun returned to lead his troops at the front. After two years training, Sun's New 38th Division was sent by Chiang Kai-shek into Burma to protect the Burma Road under General Zhang Zhen, commander of the 66th Army, together with General Du Yuming (5th Army) and General Gan Lichu (6th Army) as part of the Chinese Expeditionary Force.  Sun led the 113th Regiment as part of the 38th Division through difficult terrain to relieve 7,000 British forces trapped by the numerically superior Japanese in the Battle of Yenangyaung. His command included British artillery and 7th Armoured Brigade (United Kingdom) tanks temporarily placed under his command by General Slim. For his gallantry at Yenangyaung, Sun was honoured by King George VI with the Commander of the British Empire medal.

Although unable to stop the Japanese from cutting the Burma Road, Sun gained the respect of General William Slim, the commander of the British 14th Army.  Sun and his division retreated into India, while those of Du, against Sun's advice, retreated back into China and were badly mauled both by nature and by the Japanese.

Early in 1943, after the successful retreat into India, Sun's division was incorporated in the New First Army, and became a part of 'X Force', the Chinese force under the command of Joseph Stilwell, the American commander of all American and Chinese troops in the "China Burma India Theater".  The battle discipline of Sun's divisions reaffirmed Stilwell's respect for the Chinese soldier. His troops spearheaded the Burma Campaign, Stilwell's 1943 drive to reconquer North Burma and re-establish the land route to China by the Ledo Road. General Stilwell considered Sun the most capable Chinese field commander in the entire war. In 1945, at the invitation of American General Dwight D. Eisenhower, Sun toured the battlefields of Europe. He returned to China to lead the New First Army to Canton to accept the Japanese surrender.

Chinese Civil War
 
The end of the war with Japan did not bring peace to China. Sun's New First Army was deployed to Manchuria, where the Soviet armies left the Communist forces in control of strategic areas and the Nationalists could find support only by enlisting local bandits and surrendered Japanese troops. On May 20, 1946, Sun's troops defeated the People's Liberation Army to take a key railroad junction in the  Battle of Siping, but only after a month of fighting. General Lin Biao's communist troops had this saying: "As long as we don't have to fight the New 1st Army, we are not afraid of the Central Government's million troops." Sun said that the PLA opposing the Nationalist army was like "flies attacking a tiger," but when the PLA had a growing series of local victories, Chiang Kai-shek's favorite Du Yuming repeatedly accused Sun of insubordination.  Chiang sensed that Sun could not get the cooperation of Whampoa educated officers and replaced him with a general whom he considered more loyal. Sun was returned to a command post in Nanjing in July 1947, as the deputy commander-in-chief of the Army and commanding general of the Army Training Command. The American Consul General in Mukden at that time, O. Edmund Clubb, later recalled that because of his American education Sun was regarded as an outsider:  "personal loyalty was counted by the Nationalist regime as being more important than competence, and when you establish a standard like that you run into danger."

Taiwan
As the commander of the Army Training Command and deputy commander of the Republic of China Army in 1947, Sun moved one training facility to Taiwan, independent from the ongoing civil war.  Sun trained new officers and troops for the Nationalist government, hoping to change the tide of the civil war.  The effort was too little, too late in comparison with the massive numbers of troops defeated, but one of the divisions he trained (201 Division of the 80th Army) was sent to Quemoy to help crush off the communist invasion in 1949. It was the front line defense force.

In 1950, Sun was named Commander in Chief of the Republic of China Army, while also serving as commander of the Taiwan Defense Command and of the Army Training Command. Sun was well respected by the Americans, and rumors that the CIA sought a coup to replace Chiang Kai-shek with Sun made Chiang and his son Chiang Ching-kuo eager to remove him from power.  
  

First, Sun was reassigned as the ceremonial chief military adviser to Chiang Kai-shek in June 1954, preventing him from directly controlling any troops. In 1950, Chiang Ching-kuo became director of his father's secret police, a position he held until 1965. Chiang Ching-kuo, educated in the Soviet Union, initiated Soviet style military structure, reorganizing and Sovietizing the officer corps while instituting surveillance. Sun Li-jen, who was educated at the American Virginia Military Institute, opposed this system. On May 25, one of General Sun's subordinates, Lieutenant-Colonel Kuo Ting-liang, was arrested by Chiang Ching-kuo's associate, internal security chief Mao Jen-feng, and tortured into admitting conspiracy with a communist agent. On August 20, 1955 Sun was officially relieved from his duties and put under house arrest. A nine-person committee under Vice-President Chen Cheng was set up to investigate General Sun's involvement in the alleged spy case. The CIA also allegedly wanted to help Sun take control of Taiwan and declare its independence.  Sun, in addition to being under suspicion of collaborating with the CIA, was also accused of negligence in allowing his subordinate to participate in an alleged revolt involving Communist agents. One source suggests that the "plot" may simply have been a plan to present a petition to Generalissimo Chiang to do away with the army system of political commissars.

More than 300 of Sun's close subordinates were placed under arrest and many more were relieved of their duties. Sun remained under house arrest for more than three decades: he was not released until March 20, 1988, shortly after the death of Chiang Ching-kuo. He died in his Taichung home at the age of 89 (91 according to the Chinese calendar). His funeral was conducted with full military honors and with the presence of the Minister of National Defense and top generals.

In 2001, Sun's reputation was cleared after a government investigation into the purported coup attempt. In January 2011, President Ma Ying-jeou formally apologized to Sun Li-jen's family and Sun's house in Taichung was opened as a memorial hall and museum.

Family
General Sun was survived by his two sons Sun Tien-ping (孫天平) and Sun An-ping (孫安平), two daughters Sun Chung-ping (孫中平) and Sun Tai-ping (孫太平), and sister Sun Pi-jen (孫璧人).

See also

Chinese Army in India

Notes

References and further reading
 Sun Li-jen," in  ,pp. 165-167

External links
General Sun memorial website at National Tsing Hua University
Dedication to The Late General Sun Li Jen, designed by his foster son Chieh Chung 

1900 births
1990 deaths
Boxer Indemnity Scholarship recipients
Military personnel of the Republic of China in the Second Sino-Japanese War
National Revolutionary Army generals from Anhui
Politicians from Hefei
Purdue University alumni
Officers of the Legion of Merit
Tsinghua University alumni
Virginia Military Institute alumni
Honorary Companions of the Order of the Bath
Recipients of the Order of Blue Sky and White Sun
Foreign recipients of the Legion of Merit
Chinese Civil War refugees
Chinese anti-communists
Chinese military personnel of World War II
People of the Chinese Civil War
Republic of China politicians from Anhui
Chinese men's basketball players
Honorary Commanders of the Order of the British Empire
White Terror (Taiwan)